Scratch track may refer to:
 Scratch track race or scratch race, a track cycling discipline in which all riders start together
 Scratch track (studio recording), a preliminary recording made during the process of studio recording
 Scratch Track, an American band

See also
 Scratch (disambiguation)